Awakened Youth may refer to:

Weekh Zalmian, an Afghan political movement active from 1947 to 1952
Angkatan Pemuda Insaf (API), Malay youth division of Parti Kebangsaan Melayu Malaya (PKMM)